Dubravka Drakić (nee Vukotić) (Дубравка Вукотић) (born on June 25, 1976 in Titograd (now Podgorica), Montenegro, Yugoslavia) is a Montenegrin actress.

She performed for the city theatre of Podgorica from 1998 to 2014.

She has two children: daughter Ines, and son Filip.

Filmography
Breasts (2020)
Neverending Past (2018)
Pogled sa Ajfelovog tornja (2005)
Opet pakujemo majmune (2004) .... Landlady
Mješoviti Brak (2003) TV Series .... Bojana, Milun's wife
U ime oca i sina (1999) .... Kamenodoljanka

References

External links

1976 births
Living people
Actors from Podgorica
20th-century Montenegrin actresses
21st-century Montenegrin actresses